Phongchana Kongkirit (born 10 August 1998) is a Thai professional footballer who plays as a winger or a forward for Thai League 3 club Angthong, on loan from Buriram United.

References

Citations

General references

1998 births
Living people
Phongchana Kongkirit
Phongchana Kongkirit
Association football forwards
Phongchana Kongkirit
Phongchana Kongkirit